Freq is a 1985 album by English singer and musician Robert Calvert. It was recorded during the time of the UK miners' strike (1984-1985) and in between the songs it features snippets of field recordings by Calvert with miners on a picket line, with Calvert displaying his sympathy for their cause.

The lyrics cover various themes, only "All the Machines are Quiet" and "Picket Line" being explicitly concerned with the miners' strike. "Ned Ludd" is a reworking of a track which was originally part of his stage play The Kid from Silicon Gulch; taking its name from Ned Ludd who inspired the luddite movement in 1811, it deals with Calvert's ambivalent attitude to the impact of new technologies on people's lives.

The music saw a movement away from his previous work as a frontman of a rock group towards a minimalist electronic sound.

The tracks "Lord of the Hornets" and "The Greenfly and the Rose" were recorded as demos in preparation for Calvert's Hype album, but they were issued as a single by Flicknife Records (FLS204) in 1980. The band used for this session is a unique combination of former Hawkwind members, except for Gary Cooper who was Calvert's literary agent at the time.

Track listing
All titles written by Robert Calvert.

Side 1
"Ned Ludd" – 4:57
(talk) – 1:31
"Acid Rain" – 5:06
(talk) – 2:37
"All The Machines Are Quiet" – 5:33

Side 2
(talk) – 1:12
"Picket Line" – 3:27
(talk) – 1:06
"The Cool Courage of the Bomb Squad Officers" – 5:21
(talk) – 1:06
"Work Song" – 3:54

Bonus tracks
"Lord of the Hornets" – 3:52
"The Greenfly and the Rose" – 3:39

Personnel

Original album
Robert Calvert – 5-string guitar, treated harmonica, percussion, keyboards, drums, electronic Simmons drums, vocals
Jill Riches – keyboards, vocals
Philip G. Martin – guitars
Ray Davis – programming

Bonus tracks
Robert Calvert – vocals
Huw Lloyd-Langton – guitar
Steve Swindells – keyboards
Gary Cooper – bass on "The Greenfly and the Rose"
Lemmy – bass on "Lord of the Hornets"
Simon King – drums

Credits
Recorded: August 1984, Computer Music Studio, London
Matt Green: Remix on Cleopatra version.

Release history
January 1985: UK, Flicknife Records (SHARP 021), vinyl
June 1992: UK, Anagram Records (CDMGRAM55), CD with bonus tracks
June 1994: US, Cleopatra Records (CLEO 9467-2), CD with bonus tracks

References

External links
 aural-innovations.com – lyrics

1985 albums
Robert Calvert albums
UK miners' strike (1984–1985)